Hrasnica may refer to:

Hrasnica (Ilidža), a neighborhood near Ilidža, Bosnia and Herzegovina.
Hrasnica, Gornji Vakuf-Uskoplje, a village near Gornji Vakuf–Uskoplje, Bosnia and Herzegovina
FK Famos Hrasnica, a football club in Hrasnica, Ilidža